Sankei Dam  is a gravity dam located in Hokkaido Prefecture in Japan. The dam is used for irrigation. The catchment area of the dam is 7.5 km2. The dam impounds about 19  ha of land when full and can store 688 thousand cubic meters of water. The construction of the dam was completed in 1960.

References

Dams in Hokkaido